The following is a list of people who had assumed the role of head coach for the Philippines men's national basketball team.

List

Notes

References

   
Coaches